Elio Pecoraro (born October 13, 1967 in Rome) is an Italian former professional football player who made 101 appearances in the Italian professional leagues playing for Roma, Varese, Juventus Domo and Ostia Mare.

He played his only Serie A game in the 1986–87 season for A.S. Roma, when he came on as a substitute for the last three minutes of the last game of the season against Avellino.

References

1967 births
Living people
Italian footballers
Association football midfielders
Serie A players
A.S. Roma players
S.S.D. Varese Calcio players